The 2013 Australia Day Honours were announced on 26 January 2013 by the Governor-General of Australia, Quentin Bryce.

The Australia Day Honours, the first major honours list for a calendar year, are announced on Australia Day (26 January) every year, with the other being the Queen's Birthday Honours which are announced on the second Monday in June.

† indicates an award given posthumously.

Order of Australia

Companion (AC)

General Division

Officer (AO)

General Division

Military Division

Member (AM)

General Division

Military Division

Medal (OAM)

General Division

Military Division

Meritorious Service
Notes:

Public Service Medal (PSM)

Australian Police Medal (APM)

Australian Fire Service Medal (AFSM)

Ambulance Service Medal (ASM)

Emergency Services Medal (ESM)

Gallantry, Distinguished and Conspicuous Service
Notes:

Medal for Gallantry (MG)

Commendation for Gallantry

Distinguished Service Cross (DSC)

Bar to the Distinguished Service Medal (DSM & Bar)

Distinguished Service Medal (DSM)

Commendation for Distinguished Service

Bar to the Conspicuous Service Cross (CSC & Bar)

Conspicuous Service Cross (CSC)

Conspicuous Service Medal (CSM)

References

External links
Australian Honours Lists, www.gg.gov.au
Australia Day 2013 Honours Lists, Governor-General of Australia: The Australian Honours Secretariat
Australian Gazettes:
S1 - Order of Australia
S2 - Meritorious Service 
S3 - Distinguished and Conspicuous Service 

2013 awards in Australia
Orders, decorations, and medals of Australia